The Federal College of Education (Technical), Omoku is a federal government higher education institution located in Omoku, Rivers State, Nigeria. It is affiliated to University of Nigeria for its degree programmes. The current Provost is Emmanuel Ikenyiri.

History 
The Federal College of Education (Technical), Omoku was established in 1989.

Courses 
The institution offers the following courses;

 Political Science Education
 Music Education
 Computer Education
 Igbo Education
 Biology Education
 Chemistry Education
 Agricultural Education
 Primary Education
 Early Childhood Care Education
 Home Economics Education
 Adult and Non-Formal Education
 Economics Education
 English Education
 Computer Education
 Business Education
 Integrated Science Education
 French
Theatre Arts
Education Fine and Applied Arts
Special Education
 Physics Education
 Social Studies
 Mathematics Education
 Technical Education

Affiliation 
The institution is affiliated with the University of Nigeria to offer programmes leading to Bachelor of Education, (B.Ed.) in;

 Education and Biology
 Education and Mathematics
 Industrial Technical Education
 Home Economics And Education
 Education and Chemistry
 Education and Fine & Applied Arts
 Education and Computer Science
 Agricultural Science And Education
 Education and Computer Science
 Education and Physics
 Business Education

References

Federal colleges of education in Nigeria
1989 establishments in Nigeria
Educational institutions established in 1989
Universities and colleges in Rivers State